The International Conference on Bisexuality (ICB), also known as the International BiCon, was a periodic gathering of bisexual activists and academics from around the world.

Started by Fritz Klein and a group of fellow activists, the first ICB was held in Amsterdam in 1991 and followed the concept of a BiCon started in the UK in 1984. The last one was 2010 in London.

Past events

See also 

 BiCon (UK)
 Bisexual community

External links

"Why Bisexual Conferences are Important"   by Denise Penn in Penn Points (June 2004)

Bisexual events
Bisexual organizations
Academic conferences
LGBT conferences
International LGBT organizations